Lin Chin-sheng (1916–2001) was a Taiwanese politician.

Born in 1916, Lin earned a law degree from Tokyo Imperial University. Lin began his political career in his native Chiayi County, where he founded the Lin political faction and allied himself with the Kuomintang. Lin served as Chiayi County Magistrate from 1951 to 1954, when he was elected Yunlin County Magistrate, where he served another three-year term. In 1972, Lin was appointed interior minister, serving until 1976, when he was named Minister of Transportation and Communications. As transportation minister, Lin oversaw the construction of Taiwan Taoyuan International Airport. He opposed the airport's original name, Taoyuan International Airport, suggesting that it be named for Chiang Kai-shek instead. Lin stepped down as transport minister in 1981 and became a minister without portfolio. From 1984, he was the Vice President of the Examination Yuan. In 1987, Lin and his faction supported the Democratic Progressive Party's candidate for Chiayi County Magistrate, . He served the Examination Yuan until 1993, when he was named adviser to President Lee Teng-hui.

His son is choreographer Lin Hwai-min.

References

1916 births
2001 deaths
Magistrates of Chiayi County
Taiwanese Ministers of Transportation and Communications
Taiwanese Ministers of the Interior
University of Tokyo alumni
Senior Advisors to President Lee Teng-hui
Magistrates of Yunlin County